Elections in Indiana are held to fill various local, state and federal seats. Special elections may be held to fill vacancies at other points in time. 

In a 2020 study, Indiana was ranked as the 10th hardest state for citizens to vote in.

Elections by year
2020
2020 Indiana elections
2019
2019 Indianapolis mayoral election
2019 Indianapolis City-County Council election

2018
2018 Indiana elections

2016
2016 United States presidential election in Indiana
2016 United States Senate election in Indiana
2016 United States House of Representatives elections in Indiana
2016 Indiana gubernatorial election

2015
2015 Indianapolis mayoral election
2015 Indianapolis City-County Council election

2014
2014 Indiana elections

2012
2012 United States presidential election in Indiana
2012 United States Senate election in Indiana
2012 United States House of Representatives elections in Indiana
2012 Indiana gubernatorial election

2011
2011 Indianapolis mayoral election
2011 Indianapolis City-County Council election

2010
2010 Indiana elections

2008
March 11: 
2008 Indiana's 7th congressional district special election

May 6: 
2008 Indiana Democratic primary
2008 Indiana Republican primary

November 4: 
2008 Indiana gubernatorial election
2008 United States House of Representatives elections in Indiana
2008 United States presidential election in Indiana

Election dates

Except in special circumstances, all of Indiana's federal, state, and municipal elections occur on Election Day, being the first Tuesday following the first Monday of November. Except for members of the Indiana House of Representatives, all other elected state and municipal officials serve terms of four years.

Historically the states first elections were held on August 10, 1816. Thereafter elections occurred on the first Monday of October until 1852 when elections began to be held on Election Day.

See also
Political party strength in Indiana
United States presidential elections in Indiana

References

External links
Indiana Election Division at the Indiana Secretary of State official website

 Digital Public Library of America. Assorted materials related to Indiana elections
 

 
Government of Indiana
Political events in Indiana